McLaren is a surname. Notable people with the surname include:

Alan McLaren (born 1971), Scottish footballer
Andrew McLaren, Scottish curler
Andy McLaren (1922–1996), Scottish football player
Andy McLaren (born 1973), Scottish football player 
Angus McLaren (born 1988), Australian actor
Anne McLaren (1927–2007), British zoologist
Bill McLaren (1923–2010), Scottish sports broadcaster
Billy McLaren (born 1948), Scottish football player
Brandon Jay McLaren (born 1980), Canadian actor
Brian McLaren (born 1956), American Christian minister
Bruce McLaren (1937–1970), New Zealand racing driver
Charles Benjamin Bright McLaren (1850–1934), Scottish jurist and politician
Charles Melville McLaren (1913–2003), British industrialist and horticulturalist
Colin McLaren, Australian writer
David McLaren (1872–1939), New Zealand politician
Digby McLaren (1919–2004), Canadian geologist and palaeontologist
Duncan McLaren (1800–1886), Scottish politician
Dylan McLaren (born 1982), Australian football player
Eddie McLaren (1929–2020), Scottish footballer
Francis McLaren (1886–1917), British politician
Frankie and George McLaren (born 1997), British twin actors
Frank McLaren (1881–1961), Scottish footballer for Hearts and Hamilton Academical
Frederick McLaren (1874–1952), English cricketer 
Geoff McLaren (1921–1992), Australian politician
Gregory Paul McLaren ("Lucky Diamond Rich"; born 1971), Guinness World Record holder as "the world's most tattooed person"
Henry Charles McLaren (born 1948), British peer
Henry Duncan McLaren (1879–1953), British politician, horticulturalist and industrialist
Hollis McLaren, Canadian actress
James McLaren (born 1972), Scottish rugby player
Jim McLaren (1897–1975), Scottish football player
Jock McLaren ("Jock"; 1902–1956), Australian military officer
John McLaren (disambiguation)
John McLaren, Lord McLaren (1831–1910), Scottish politician and judge
John McLaren (1846–1943), American horticulturist
John McLaren (1871–1958), Australian public servant
John McLaren (1886–1921), Australian cricketer
John McLaren (born 1951), American baseball coach and manager
John F. McLaren (fl. 1855–58), chancellor of the University of Pittsburgh
John Francis McLaren (1919–1953), British military pilot
John Inglis McLaren, Canadian politician
Kenneth McLaren (1860–1924), British military commander
Kyle McLaren (born 1977), Canadian ice hockey player
Laura McLaren, Baroness Aberconway (1854–1933), British women's rights activist
Leah McLaren (born 1975), Canadian writer and columnist
Malcolm McLaren (1946–2010), British music manager
Martin McLaren (1914–1979), British military commander and politician
Mick McLaren (born 1930), Rhodesian military commander
Norman McLaren (1913–1987), Scottish-born Canadian animator and film director
Paul McLaren (born 1976), English football player
Peter McLaren (born 1948), Canadian-born theorist of critical pedagogy
Richard McLaren (born 1945), Canadian expert on sports law
Robin McLaren (1934–2010), British diplomat
Lady Rose McLaren (1919–2005), British aristocrat
Ross McLaren (born 1953), Canadian film director
Ryan McLaren (born 1983), South African cricketer
Samuel McLaren (1876–1916), Australian mathematician
Sarah McLaren, New Zealand environmental scientist 
Scott McLaren (born 1968), Australian football referee
Steve McLaren (born 1975), Canadian ice hockey player
Stuart McLaren (fl. 1902), Australian rugby union player
Stuart McLaren (born 1975), Scottish/Australian football player and coach
Timothy McLaren (born 1956), Australian rower
Tommy McLaren (1949–1978), Scottish football player
Walter McLaren (1853–1912), British politician
Wayne McLaren (1940–1992), American stuntman, model, actor, and rodeo performer
William McLaren (disambiguation)
William McLaren (born 1887), Scottish football player
William McLaren (1923–1987), Scottish illustrator
Willie McLaren (born 1984), Scottish football player

McClaren
 Steve McClaren
 McClaren (Porridge), a character in the BBC sitcom Porridge

See also
 McLaren (disambiguation)
 MacLaren (surname)
 Baron Aberconway, family name

Anglicised Scottish Gaelic-language surnames
Clan MacLaren